Side was a place on the border between the two cities of Lamia and Hypata, in Ainis in ancient Thessaly. It is mentioned only in a boundary adjudication inscription of the Hadrianic period, CIL 3.586. 

Its site is identified with an ancient fortress on a hill near Lygaria (Lygaria was, until 1920, called Tsopalades) in  Phthiotida regional unit.

References

Populated places in ancient Thessaly
Former populated places in Greece
Ainis